Sucre Municipality may refer to:

Bolivia
 Sucre Municipality, Chuquisaca, Chuquisaca Department

Colombia
 Sucre, Cauca
 Sucre, Santander
 Sucre, Sucre Department

Venezuela
Sucre Municipality, Aragua
Sucre Municipality, Bolívar
Sucre Municipality, Falcón
Sucre Municipality, Mérida
Sucre Municipality, Miranda
Sucre Municipality, Portuguesa
Sucre Municipality, Sucre State
Sucre Municipality, Táchira
Sucre Municipality, Trujillo
Sucre Municipality, Yaracuy
Sucre Municipality, Zulia

See also
 Antonio José de Sucre Municipality, Barinas, Venezuela
 Sucre (disambiguation)

Municipality name disambiguation pages